The Rapid River is a river in Sudbury District and Greater Sudbury in Northwestern Ontario, Canada.

See also
List of rivers of Ontario

References

External links
Map showing Vermillion river drainage basin and tributary drainage basins in and around Greater Sudbury

Rivers of Sudbury District
Rivers of Greater Sudbury